Kristine Woods is an American multidisciplinary artist known for her work in sculpture and textiles.

References

External links
 Website for Kristine Woods

Living people
American textile artists
Women textile artists
Year of birth missing (living people)